Myrcia ascendens is a species of plant in the family Myrtaceae, endemic to Bahia in north-east Brazil, and first described in 2015.

Etymology 
The species name refers to the pattern of the plant's branches, which are mostly all held straight upwards.

Description 
Myrcia ascendens is a shrub or small tree that grows to between 1 and 3 metres tall. Leaves grow up to 16mm long and 5mm wide. Fruits are red, up to 6mm wide with up to 2 seeds.

Distribution 
This plant has only been found on rock outcrops close to rivers, in the municipal park of Mucugê,  and the Serra de São Pedro.

Conservation status 
Myrcia ascendens is considered to be critically endangered due to its limited distribution.

References

ascendens
Tropical fruit
Flora of South America
Endemic flora of Brazil
Fruits originating in South America
Fruit trees
Berries
Plants described in 2015